Şener is a Turkish name and may refer to:

Given name
 Şener Özbayraklı, Turkish footballer
 Şener Şen, Turkish actor
Şener Korkusuz (born 1979), Turkish American entrepreneur, American 7s Football League (A7FL) CEO and co-founder

Surname
 Abdüllatif Şener, Turkish politician
 Aydan Şener, Turkish film and television actress
 Erman Şener, Turkish film critic, screenwriter, author, columnist, TV host and producer
 Kerem Şener (born 2003), Turkish artistic gymniast
 Semin Öztürk Şener (born 1991), Turkish female aerobatics pilot
 Yakup Şener (born 1990), Turkish amateur boxer

Turkish-language surnames
Turkish masculine given names